Mikhail Vadimovich Yakovlev (born 4 March 1999) is a Russian football player who plays for FC Arsenal Tula.

Club career
He made his debut in the Russian Football National League for FC Neftekhimik Nizhnekamsk on 12 August 2020 in a game against FC Yenisey Krasnoyarsk.

References

External links
 
 Profile by Russian Football National League
 

1999 births
Sportspeople from Lipetsk
Living people
Russian footballers
Russia youth international footballers
Association football midfielders
FC Rubin Kazan players
FC KAMAZ Naberezhnye Chelny players
FC Neftekhimik Nizhnekamsk players
FC Metallurg Lipetsk players
FC Arsenal Tula players
Russian First League players
Russian Second League players